Leovigildo López Fitoria (June 27, 1927 – August 5, 2016) was a Nicaraguan Catholic bishop.

Ordained in 1954, López Fitoria served as bishop of the Diocese of Granada, Nicaragua from 1972 to 2003.

Notes

1927 births
2016 deaths
20th-century Roman Catholic bishops in Nicaragua
21st-century Roman Catholic bishops in Nicaragua
Roman Catholic bishops of Granada